Cha Sun-woo (Korean: 차선우, born September 5, 1992), better known by his stage name Baro, is a South Korean rapper, singer, lyricist, and actor. He is a former member of boy group B1A4 and is currently under HODU&U Entertainment. He made his acting debut through the hit 2013 cable drama Reply 1994 and additionally received critical acclaim for his role in the television series God's Gift - 14 Days (2014) and Angry Mom (2015).

Early life 
Baro was born in Gwangju, South Korea with one younger sister who is four years younger than him (debuting in 2017 with the stage name "I").

Career

Pre-debut
Baro was first discovered by a company representative who came across his photo posted on his friend's homepage on social network service Cyworld. At his audition, Baro sang Sumi Jo's "Once I Leave" and Sung Si-kyung's "The Road to Me", in addition to rapping and beatboxing. Baro then joined the company, training for at least 2 years before debuting.

2011−2018: B1A4 

After years of training, Baro joined as the main rapper of B1A4. On April 11, 2011, WM Entertainment revealed Baro as the second member to be revealed after Jinyoung.

On April 20, 2011, B1A4 released their debut Track "OK" and mini album "Let's Fly", making their debut on April 23, 2011 on MBC's Show! Music Core. 

On June 30, 2018, WM Entertainment confirmed that Baro and Jinyoung had left the agency following the end of their contracts. Their activities with the group remain in discussion. In November 16, WM Entertainment has announced that B1A4 members Jinyoung and Baro will be leaving the agency, with the remaining three members—CNU, Sandeul, and Gongchan—to continue promoting as B1A4.

Personal life
On June 5, 2013, while preparing for B1A4's follow up single "Starlight's Song", Baro strained his ankle ligament. Initially, the group was going to adjust its promotional tour depending on Baro's recovery. However, because his recovery took longer than they had expected, the What's Going On Tour ended earlier than planned.

Discography

Filmography

Film

Television series

Web series

Theater

Awards and nominations

References

External links

1992 births
Japanese-language singers of South Korea
Living people
People from Gwangju
South Korean male idols
South Korean male singers
South Korean pop singers
South Korean male rappers
South Korean male film actors
South Korean male television actors
B1A4 members
WM Entertainment artists
South Korean hip hop record producers